The Goldfields Gas Pipeline is a  natural gas transmission pipeline which transports natural gas from Carnarvon basin producers in the north-west of Western Australia to Kalgoorlie in the south-east of Western Australia. The pipeline first transmitted gas in June 1996, and reached Kalgoorlie in September 1996. The Goldfields Gas Pipeline is connected to the Newman Power Station (100% owned by Alinta Energy) by a  lateral pipeline constructed in 1996.

Alinta Energy owns an 11.8% interest in the Goldfields Gas Pipeline, with the remaining interest held by the APA Group.

References

External links 
Alinta Energy generation

See also 

 Alinta Energy

Natural gas in Western Australia
Natural gas pipelines in Australia
1996 establishments in Australia
Transport buildings and structures in Western Australia